Runny Babbit: A Billy Sook is a children's book by Shel Silverstein.  A work in progress for the better part of 20 years, the book was published posthumously in 2005.  The book is largely composed of spoonerisms in rhyming verse.

Plot
Other than speaking only in spoonerisms, Runny is a normal child. He has many friends, and two loving parents, his "Dummy and Mad," who often remind him to "Shake a tower," "Dash the wishes," "Trush your beeth," "Rean up your cloom," and other chores.

References

2005 poetry books
2005 children's books
American children's books
American poetry collections
Children's poetry books
Books published posthumously
Books about rabbits and hares
Books by Shel Silverstein
HarperCollins books